National Institute of Cultural Studies is located in Lok Virsa Museum, Islamabad, Pakistan.

History
National Institute of Cultural Studies (NICS) was established by public-private partnership between the Government of Pakistan and Cosmos Productions (Pvt Limited), Islamabad. NICS was founded to educate and nurture students, artisans and professionals in the fields of arts & culture and media and business.

Rauf Khalid, until his death in a road accident in 2011, was the founding President and Chancellor of this institute.

Programs and courses 
National Institute of Cultural Studies consist of seven departments and offers different courses like Arts & Design, Cultural Heritage, Media Sciences and Business Studies at diploma and certificate level.
 Media Studies Department
 Hotel Management Department
 Fashion & Textile Department
 Graphic Design Department
 Interior Design Department
 Beauty and Personal Grooming
 Information Technology Department

See also
 Lok Virsa Museum

References

External links
National Institute of Cultural Studies, Islamabad - official website

Islamabad
Education in Islamabad
Art schools in Pakistan